McGuffey High School is one of four schools that make up the McGuffey School District in rural Claysville, Pennsylvania, located approximately 30 miles southwest of Pittsburgh. The school's official colors are navy blue and gold and "Highlanders" has been adopted as the official school nickname. The McGuffey High School building is jointly used by McGuffey Middle School. The school and the district are named for William Holmes McGuffey, author of the McGuffey Reader, who was born within the district boundaries.

References

External links
 Public School Report: McGuffey High School

Schools in Washington County, Pennsylvania
Public high schools in Pennsylvania
Education in Pittsburgh area